"" is a traditional Fijian farewell song.

Origin
The origin of this song is disputed. One versions holds that Turaga Bale na Tu'i Nayau, Ratu Tevita Uluilakeba composed it in 1916 for Adi Litia Tavanavanua (1900–1983), when she visited Tubou, Lakeba, in 1916. The Fiji Museum holds Uluilakeba's manuscript, but according to its description he composed the song in 1918 while he was in training as a civil servant in Suva. Tevita Uluilakeba was the father of Ratu Sir Kamisese Mara, founding father of the modern nation of Fiji.

Alternatively, "Isa Lei" is the Fijian version of a Tongan love song ("") used to court the then Princess Salote (later Sālote Tupou III). It was written in 1915 and was heard by a visiting Fijian sergeant. From there, the Fijians adopted it to a farewell song, but they kept the Tongan melody.

Lieutenant A. W. Caten, a bandmaster from the Fijian Defence Forces, created a foxtrot arrangement in 1932; he is often credited in modern recordings of the song, including in versions by The Seekers, and Ry Cooder and V. M. Bhatt on their album A Meeting by the River. It was regularly performed by Fijian singer Sakiusa Bulicokocoko.

Melody

Source:

Fijian text

Tongan text

See also

Music of Fiji
Music of Tonga

References

External links

Fijian songs
Tongan music
1916 songs